John Callanan (20 May 1910 – 15 June 1982) was an Irish Fianna Fáil politician from County Galway.

Callanan was born in Kilconnell, near Ballinasloe, County Galway, to a farming family. In the 1950s, he was an active member of the Irish farmers' youth association Macra na Feirme.

Callanan was elected to Dáil Éireann as Fianna Fáil Teachta Dála (TD) for the Clare–South Galway constituency at the 1973 general election, and re-elected at the 1977 general election for the new Galway East constituency. He held that seat at the next two general elections, but died in office in 1982. The resulting by-election for the seat was won by the Fianna Fáil candidate Noel Treacy.

He was an uncle of the former Galway East TD, Joe Callanan who served from 2002 to 2007.

See also
Families in the Oireachtas

References

1910 births
1982 deaths
Politicians from County Galway
Fianna Fáil TDs
Members of the 20th Dáil
Members of the 21st Dáil
Members of the 22nd Dáil
Members of the 23rd Dáil